Humphreys Station (formerly, Humphreys) is an unincorporated community in Fresno County, California.

The name honors pioneer John W. Humphreys.

References

Unincorporated communities in California
Unincorporated communities in Fresno County, California